František Šťastný (12 November 1927 – 8 April 2000) was a Czech Grand Prix motorcycle road racer.

He started his sports career as bicycle racer. In 1948, he competed in the Peace Race. He competed in his first motorcycle race in 1947 on a DKW motorcycle. In 1952, he competed in the Czechoslovak Grand Prix with a used Norton motorcycle, finishing 7th. In 1953, he became a member of the Jawa factory racing team. He was the Czechoslovak motorcycle champion five times (500cc in 1956, 350cc in 1958, 350cc in 1959, 250 cc in 1960, 350 cc in 1965). He won Czechoslovak Grand Prix eight times (1954 250 cc, 1956 350 cc, 1958 350 cc, 1959 350 cc, 1960 250 cc and 350 cc, 1961 350 cc, 1962 500 cc).

In 1957 he competed in his first Grand Prix world championship race. His most successful season was 1961 in the 350cc class – he participated in 5 races and won twice (German Grand Prix and Swedish Grand Prix), gaining 3rd place twice and finishing the season with 26 points, second overall behind Gary Hocking. He was also multi-time competitor in the Isle of Man TT, with best results in 1962 and 1963 in 350cc class.

After end of active sport career he was a sportscaster for Czechoslovak Television.

Motorcycle Grand Prix results 
Points system from 1950 to 1968:

Points system from 1969 onwards:

(key) (Races in italics indicate fastest lap)

References

External links 
 Biography on page of Český rozhlas 

1927 births
2000 deaths
Czechoslovak motorcycle racers
500cc World Championship riders
350cc World Championship riders
250cc World Championship riders
Isle of Man TT riders
Czech motorcycle racers
People from Mladá Boleslav District
Recipients of Medal of Merit (Czech Republic)
Sportspeople from the Central Bohemian Region